Delivered is a 1998 thriller/crime film directed by Guy Ferland. A pizza boy finds a murdered man at his next delivery and becomes the murderer's next intended victim.

External links

1998 films
1998 crime thriller films
1998 comedy-drama films
American comedy-drama films
Films directed by Guy Ferland
Films scored by Nicholas Pike
1990s English-language films
1990s American films